Ooni Aworokolokin was the 12th Ooni of Ife, a paramount traditional ruler of Ile Ife, the ancestral home of the Yorubas. He succeeded Odidimode Rogbeesin and was succeeded by  
Ooni Ekun.

References

Oonis of Ife
Yoruba history